The Thirtieth Amendment of the Constitution (Treaty on Stability, Coordination and Governance in the Economic and Monetary Union) Act 2012 (previously bill no. 23 of 2012) amended the Constitution of Ireland to permit Ireland to ratify the 2012 European Fiscal Compact and to preclude measures taken under the Compact from being held to be inconsistent with the Irish constitution. It was approved by referendum on 31 May 2012, by 60.3% to 39.7%, on a turnout of 50% and was signed into law by President Michael D. Higgins on 27 June 2012.

The decision to hold a referendum on the Fiscal Compact was made by the Irish government following advice from the Attorney General, and was announced by Taoiseach Enda Kenny on 28 February 2012 prior to the signing ceremony.

Change to the text
The following subsection was added to Article 29.4:

Oireachtas debate
The Thirtieth Amendment of the Constitution (Treaty on Stability, Coordination and Governance in the Economic and Monetary Union) Bill was proposed in Dáil Éireann by Tánaiste and Minister for Foreign Affairs and Trade Eamon Gilmore on 18 April 2012. It passed final stage in the Dáil on 20 April and final stages in Seanad Éireann on 24 April.

High Court challenge
In May 2012, Independent TD Thomas Pringle brought a High Court challenge over the Irish European Fiscal Compact referendum. He asked the High Court to check the legality of the referendum as the fiscal treaty is intertwined with the European Stability Mechanism (ESM) treaty and an amendment to another treaty.

Referendum campaign

Proponents
On 27 May, Taoiseach Enda Kenny appealed to voters to support the referendum in order to contribute to a recovery from Ireland's financial crisis. "This treaty strengthens the economic and budgetary rules that apply to countries like Ireland that use the euro. It will create stability in the euro zone that is essential for growth and job creation. A strong yes vote will create the certainty and stability that our country needs to continue on the road to economic recovery."

Opponents
The No Campaign referred to it as the Austerity Treaty. Sinn Féin leader Gerry Adams promising to lead a "strong anti-treaty campaign" to stop what he described as a pact that would worsen the Irish government's "terrible policy of austerity." Independent TD Shane Ross called for the Irish people to reject the treaty as "the only way to stop a process that would end in Ireland's surrender of economic decision-making." The United Left Alliance also campaigned for a No vote in the 2012 European Fiscal Compact referendum.

On 29 February 2012, Éamon Ó Cuív resigned as Fianna Fáil's Deputy leader and Communications spokesperson due to dissatisfaction with his party's position on the referendum. He vowed to vote against the treaty and said "joining a badly designed monetary union had cost Ireland... the people of Europe do not agree that there is only one way forward." Fianna Fáil party whip Seán Ó Fearghaíl then sent Ó Cuív a letter which put a gag on him during the referendum campaign for speaking out of turn and expressing his own opinion against the party's wishes.

Debates
TV3 hosted the first live televised debate concerning the European Fiscal Compact referendum. It was an hour-long debate, hosted by Vincent Browne, and airing on 1 May at 21:00. Sinn Féin deputy president Mary Lou McDonald and Joe Higgins of the Socialist Party put the case for a No vote, and while Fianna Fáil leader Micheál Martin and agriculture minister Simon Coveney of Fine Gael called on viewers to vote Yes. Taoiseach Enda Kenny refused to participate in the debate, citing comments made previously by the host. Tánaiste Eamon Gilmore also declined to join the debate.

Lucinda Creighton and Clare Daly appeared on Prime Time while the TV3 debate was happening.

A debate held on The Frontline on 21 May 2012 descended into chaos. Celebrity "Dragon" Norah Casey and Tánaiste Eamon Gilmore represented "Yes", while Declan Ganley and Sinn Féin deputy leader Mary Lou McDonald represented "No". At one stage presenter Pat Kenny shouted down a farmer in the audience who was advocating a No vote.

A 45-minute debate, this time "strictly marshalled" by Richard Crowley, was held on Prime Time on 29 May 2012. Fianna Fáil director of elections Timmy Dooley and Labour's Joan Burton represented "Yes", while the Socialist Party's Clare Daly and Sinn Féin deputy leader Mary Lou McDonald represented "No". Following Richard Bruton's gaffe on live radio (see below), Joan Burton declined repeated attempts to have her say whether Labour would agree to a second referendum in the event of the "No" side prevailing.

Notable moments
On 19 April 2012, the government launched a website offering information about the treaty. Having claimed that this was a neutral source of information, the government came under pressure to remove some content from the site which explicitly called for a Yes vote.  When questioned why, in light of the ruling in the Patricia McKenna case that it was unconstitutional for the government to spend public money to promote one side of a referendum debate, the government was launching a website which contained partisan material, Minister Leo Varadkar replied that as they had launched the website before moving the writ to formally call the referendum, the ruling did not apply. The government was also criticised for diverting millions of euro to fund this website and related leaflet drop from the budget of the Referendum Commission whose role it is to provide unbiased information on referendums in Ireland.

On 16 May, Minister for Finance Michael Noonan caused controversy with a comment of Greek "holidays" and "feta cheese" at a breakfast briefing with Bloomberg news agency. Noonan said these were the only links between Ireland and Greece.

On 17 May, Taoiseach Enda Kenny was heckled and booed by opponents of the compact in Galway as he attended a breakfast briefing. Later that day, Minister for Jobs, Enterprise and Innovation Richard Bruton let slip on radio the possibility of there being a second referendum if the Irish people voted "No".

Opinion polls

Result

References

External links
Official sites
Thirtieth Amendment of the Constitution (Treaty on Stability, Coordination and Governance in the Economic and Monetary Union) Act 2012
Full text of the Constitution of Ireland
Thirtieth Amendment of the Constitution (Treaty on Stability, Coordination and Governance in the Economic and Monetary Union) Bill 2012 (Bill 23 of 2012) index of stages of the bill's passage
Stability Treaty Referendum Merrionstreet.ie
Fiscal Stability Treaty Citizens Information Board

News overviews
RTÉ.ie:
Referendum 2012: Fiscal Treaty Guide, Tony Connelly
"fiscal treaty" tag index
Fiscal Treaty Referendum The Irish Times
National News > Fiscal Treaty Independent.ie
"EU Fiscal Treaty referendum" tag index Newstalk

2012 in Irish law
Amendment, 30
2012 referendums
2012 in the Republic of Ireland
30
30
Ireland, 30
May 2012 events in Europe
Amendment, 30, 2012